Louise de Clermont-Tallard, comtesse de Tonnerre and duchesse d'Uzès (1504-1596), was a French court official.  She was a lady-in-waiting of queen regent Catherine de Medici of France and a royal governess of king Charles IX of France.  She was an influential figure at the French royal court as the favorite of the queen-regent and a member of the intimate circle of the royal family.

Life
Louise de Clermont was the daughter of Bernardin de Clermont and Anne de Husson.  She married François du Bellay (died 1554) in 1539, and Antoine de Crussol in 1556.  She was a maid-of-honor to the queen mother Louise of Savoy prior to her marriage.  She met Catherine de Medici in 1533 and became one of her personal friends and confidantes from this point on.  In 1552, she was formally appointed lady-in-waiting to queen Catherine.  She was appointed governess to the royal children.

References

 Allan Tulchin, That Men Would Praise the Lord: The Triumph of Protestantism in Nimes, 1530-1570

French ladies-in-waiting
1504 births
1596 deaths
Governesses to the Children of France
Household of Catherine de' Medici